Ripley County is the name of two counties in the United States:

 Ripley County, Indiana
 Ripley County, Missouri